Alexandre Guyon (1829–1905) was a French actor and singer who starred in numerous theatrical productions.

Guyon made his debut in 1845 and he retired in 1895.  He was married to actress Marie-Pauline Jarry (1836–1910).  His sons, Charles-Alexandre Guyon and Aline Guyon were also actors.
  

1829 births
1905 deaths
19th-century French male singers
French male stage actors
19th-century French male actors